Aliqtisadi is an Arabic-language business news portal that covers several countries including the UAE, Saudi Arabia, Syria, Egypt, Lebanon, Palestine and United Kingdom. It is published by Haykal Media, based in twofour54, Abu Dhabi, UAE.

Background
Aliqtisadi was founded by media and technology entrepreneur Abdulsalam Haykal, as the cornerstone of the publishing company, Haykal Media. The first edition appeared on 6 December 2004.

It started in 2004, originally as a Syrian newsmagazine published monthly in Damascus. It was the first private business magazine to be licensed in Syria, since all private media was nationalized by Gamal Abdel Nasser in 1958, during the short-lived Syrian-Egyptian union. The magazine started in December 2004, and now goes by the motto The magazine of every Syrian.

Aliqtisadi was published as Aliqtisad wal Naql until December 2007. In January 2008, the frequency changed to bi-weekly, and the name was changed to Aliqtisadi.

Editorial board and publisher
The magazine is edited by Syrian journalist Hamoud Almahmoud and is published by Haykal Media, which also produces Syria's only English-monthly Forward Magazine, and the lifestyle monthly Happynings. The company is also involved in online media. The magazine officers as stated on their website are:
 Abdulsalam Haykal, Group Publisher, CEO of Haykal Media
 Hamoud Al Mahmoud, Executive editor-in-chief
 Ammar Haykal, VP Operations, Haykal Media

References

External links 
 Aliqtisadi UAE
 Aliqtisadi KSA
 Aliqtisadi Syria
 Haykal Media Official Website

Publishing companies established in 2004
Companies based in Abu Dhabi